Holidaze is an American comic book series created by writer Dave Dellecese and artist Andrew Cieslinski. It focuses on adult versions of famous mythical characters from childhood such as Santa Claus, the Tooth Fairy, Cupid, and the Easter Bunny, spending their off-the-clock time drinking together at their favorite bar, Holidaze.

First issued in 2013 in digital format via comiXology and Amazon Kindle, the first five issues were collected in trade paperback form in 2015.

Holidaze has been named a "Top 10 Essential Christmas Digital Comic" by the United Kingdom's Pipedream Comics: The Best of Indie, Small Press and Comics as well as "a hilarious and clever series" by the popular comic, movies, and pop culture website Bleeding Cool.

References

American comics titles